was founded in 1921 as Red Line Thermometer Corporation by a group of medical scientists led by Dr. Kitasato Shibasaburō to produce medical thermometers in Japan.

The company's first product was "Jintan Taionkei", the first Japanese-made thermometer available for sale, and it has since expanded into a medical devices manufacturer, producing medical disposables, cardiovascular systems and diabetes care products.

In 1971, Terumo opened its first overseas office in the United States. Since then, the company has established subsidiaries in Europe (1971), South America, China, India, Philippines, Vietnam, Thailand and Australia. The company later expanded its product range to include coronary stents and catheters, and acquired, among others, the cardiovascular specialty companies Vascutek and Microvention in 2002 and 2006 respectively.

Business segments and products 

 Terumo Corporation was organized into three business segments:

 Cardiac & Vascular Business
 Intravascular ultrasound systems
 Catheters for the treatment of coronary artery disease
 Drug-eluting stents
 Angiographic catheters
 Abdominal and peripheral endovascular coils
 Heart-lung machines
 Oxygenators with integrated arterial filter
 Artificial vascular grafts
 Blood Management Business
 Automated blood collection system
 Automated blood component processing devices
 Blood bag systems with leukocyte reduction filter
 Pathogen reduction technology systems
 Therapeutic apheresis systems
 Cell expansion systems
 General Hospital Business
 IV catheters
 Infusion sets
 Syringe pumps
 Blood glucose monitoring systems
 Lancing devices for blood collection
 CAPD systems
 Digital thermometers
 Blood pressure monitors

Terumo Penpol, the company's subsidiary in Trivandrum, India is the largest manufacturer of blood bags in India and supplies it to over 82 countries. 

Acquisitions
In July 1999 Terumo acquired the cardiovascular division of 3M Company, and established Terumo Cardiovascular Systems Corp. in the USA.

In 2001 the company made two more acquisitions: it acquired the home oxygen division of Sumitomo Bakelite Co., Ltd., and establish Terumo Medical Care K.K., and Ikiken Co., Ltd. of Japan.

In 2002 the company enters into the vascular prostheses business by acquiring UK-based Vascutek Ltd.

Four years later, in 2006 the company ventured into a new field (endovascular coils for the treatment of cerebral aneurysms) by buying American company MicroVention Inc.

The tissue heart valve division of Kohler Chemine GmbH was acquired in March 2007 and  expanded Terumo's operations related to vascular prostheses.

A year later the Japanese company Clinical Supply Co., Ltd. became a Terumo subsidiary and enhanced Terumo's interventional systems business in the field of radiotherapy.

In March 2011, the company bought U.S. medical device company CaridianBCT for around $2.6 billion. It was the largest acquisition by a Japanese medical equipment maker at the time.

The same year Harvest Technologies Corporation—point-of-care cell therapy—and Onset Medical Corp.—sheath technology designed for multiple, minimally-invasive clinical applications—was acquired.

In 2018, after the acquisition of Bolton Medical, a merger with Vascutek Ltd. gave place to the new company Terumo Aortic, focusing on “expanding aortic treatment options.”

References

External links

 Global website 
 Terumo Corporation Japan Website 
 Terumo Cardiovascular Systems Website
 Terumo Europe
 Terumo Penpol
 Microvention Website
 Vascutek Website

Manufacturing companies based in Tokyo
Health care companies of Japan
Companies listed on the Tokyo Stock Exchange
Health care companies established in 1921
Japanese brands
Manufacturing companies established in 1921
Japanese companies established in 1921